Gemini, in comics, may refer to:

 Gemini (Marvel Comics), a member of the Zodiac in Marvel Comics
 Gemini (DC Comics), the "daughter" of Brotherhood of Evil member Madame Rouge in DC Comics
 Gemini (Image Comics), a mind controlled superhero; part of Jay Faerber's creator owned line of comics from Image.

See also
Gemini (disambiguation)